Rusko is a municipality of Finland.

It is located in  Western Finland and is part of the Southwest Finland region. The municipality has a population of 
which 
is water. The population density is
.

The municipality is unilingually Finnish.

The municipality of Vahto was consolidated with Rusko on 1 January 2009.

References

External links

Municipality of Rusko – Official website 

Municipalities of Southwest Finland